Marino Samahan ng mga Seaman, Inc., also known as the Marino Party List is a political organization with representation in the House of Representatives of the Philippines. It aims to represent the interest of Filipino seafarers and the maritime industry of the Philippines.

History
The Marino Partylist was established on February 14, 2014. It sought representation in the House of Representatives' 18th Congress and ran in the 2019 elections. It competed with Ang Partido ng mga Pilipinong Marino (ANGKLA) as the representative partylist for Filipino seafarers in the Congress.

Marino Partylist secured two seats in the lower house of the Congress which were filled in by Carlo Lisandro Gonzales and Jose Antonio Lopez who are both business executives. Gonzales was vice president for Operations for Ulticon Builders and Lopez was involved with the Udenna Corporation of Dennis Uy. Lopez eligibility to hold office was disputed by a Pasig resident under the Party-list System Act alleging Lopez held American citizenship and/or permanent residency which would make him ineligible to be a partylist nominee. Lopez vacated the seat due to personal reasons and was filled in by Macnell Lusotan in late 2019.

Advocacy
The Marino Partylist's is oriented towards affairs related to Filipino seafarers and the maritime industry of the Philippines. It also leans towards the administration of President Rodrigo Duterte and is supportive of the president's maritime policy. The party has five named priority: cadet scholarships, family centers, trainings, free legal services and decentralization.

Representatives to Congress

References

Party-lists represented in the House of Representatives of the Philippines
Political organizations based in the Philippines
Maritime organizations
2014 establishments in the Philippines